Gary S. Wand is an American physician and an Alfredo Rivière and Norma Rodriguez de Rivière professor who specializes in endocrinology and metabolism. He is a Johns Hopkins School of Medicine laboratory director, focusing on neuropsychoendocrinology.   He is also Director of the Johns Hopkins School of Medicine Fellowship Program.

He holds an M.D. from the George Washington University School of Medicine (1980).  After post-doctoral training in endocrinology and metabolism at the Johns Hopkins University School of Medicine, he became a fellow in the peptide laboratories of JHU’s Department of Neuroscience, and subsequently joined the JHU faculty. 

Wand is a recipient of the National Institutes of Health Merit Award. He is a member of the Endocrine Society, Pituitary Society and the American College of Neuropsychopharmacology. In 2008 he wrote a research paper called The influence of stress on the transition from drug use to addiction which was published by the National Institutes of Health in one of their journals. A year later he collaborated with M Uhart to an article called Stress, alcohol and drug interaction: An update of human research which was published by Addiction Biology.

Other publications

References

External links
PubMed search for Gary S. Wand

Living people
American endocrinologists
Year of birth missing (living people)

Johns Hopkins School of Medicine faculty
George Washington University School of Medicine & Health Sciences alumni
American medical researchers